Joshua Ralph (born 21 July 1997) is a  international rugby league footballer who plays as a  for the Toulouse Olympique in the Championship.

Background
He was born on the Gold Coast, Queensland, Australia.

Ralph played for junior clubs Runaway Bay Seagulls and Nerang Roosters.

Playing career
He represented the Queensland under-15s before playing two seasons for the Gold Coast Titans in the Holden Cup. He then represented the Queensland under-18s before signing with the Newcastle Knights for the 2017 Holden Cup (Under-20s). 

Near the end of the 2017 season he rejoined the Tweed Heads Seagulls in the Queensland Cup.

He was named in the Welsh squad for the 2017 Rugby League World Cup, qualifying through his Welsh grandmother.

Ralph was also named in the Wales squad for the 2021 Rugby League World Cup.

References

https://www.northsydneybears.com.au/josh-ralph/

External links
(archived by web.archive.org) Statistics at rlwc2017.com
Wales profile
Welsh profile

1997 births
Living people
Australian people of Welsh descent
Australian rugby league players
Mount Pritchard Mounties players
North Sydney Bears players
North Sydney Bears NSW Cup players
Rugby league halfbacks
Rugby league players from Gold Coast, Queensland
Toulouse Olympique players
Tweed Heads Seagulls players
Wales national rugby league team players